The Estelline Bandstand and Gazebo Park, at 105 N. Main in Estelline, South Dakota, was listed on the National Register of Historic Places in 1999.

The Estelline Bandstand, now known as the Estelline Gazebo, is within Gazebo Park, and was built in 1927.

It is built of white concrete and beadboard, and has eight octagonal pillars supporting its roof.  There are eleven balusters between each  of seven pairs of pillars;  six steps descend between the last pairing.

References

Bandstands in the United States
National Register of Historic Places in South Dakota
Buildings and structures completed in 1927
Hamlin County, South Dakota
Gazebos